Matzoquiles is a Mexican-Jewish fusion dish somewhat similar to the Ashkenazi Jewish dish matzah brei, the Mexican dish chilaquiles, and the Yemenite Jewish dish fatoot samneh, and is popular during Passover.

Overview
Matzoquiles are often a homemade dish served during Passover. Some restaurants serve matzoquiles such as Wise Sons in San Francisco, which serves their version with a tomatillo-pasilla chile salsa Verde.

Preparation
Typically, sheets of matzo are broken into large pieces and lightly fried. Sometime pieces of matzo are broken and soaked in beaten eggs, which are then scrambled together similar to a matzah brei. Red or green salsa is poured over the crisp matzo pieces. The mixture is simmered until the matzo pieces begin to  soften. Matzoquiles are commonly garnished with sour cream, cheese, sliced onion, avocado, and radish slices. Matzoquiles are often served with guacamole, or refried beans, and topped with eggs scrambled or fried.

References

See also

 Matzah brei
 Chilaquiles
 Fatoot samneh

Fusion cuisine
Hispanic and Latino-Jewish culture in the United States
Jewish American cuisine
Jewish cuisine
Jews and Judaism in Mexico
Mexican-American culture
Mexican cuisine
Matzo
Passover foods